Košice is the second largest city in Slovakia.

Kosice or Košice may also refer to:

People
Gyula Kosice (1924–2016), Argentinian sculptor

Places

Czech Republic
Kosice (Hradec Králové District), a municipality and village in Hradec Králové Region
Košice (Kutná Hora District), a municipality and village in Central Bohemian Region
Košice (Tábor District), a municipality and village in South Bohemian Region

Poland
Kosice, Poland, a village

See also